Murakami may refer to:

 3295 Murakami, a minor planet
 Murakami (crater), an impact crater on the far side of the Moon
 Murakami (name), a Japanese surname, including a list of people with the name
 Murakami, Niigata, a city in Niigata prefecture
 Murakami Domain, a clan within Feudal Japan
 "Murakami", a song by Russian rock singer Svetlana Surganova
 "Murakami", a song on the 2015 album Without My Enemy What Would I Do by U.S. band Made In Heights

See also
 Murakami Station (disambiguation)